Doon Public School is a co-educational private secondary school, in Paschim Vihar, Delhi, India.  The school uses English as the medium for instruction. The school is housed in an imposing red brick structure and is over forty years old. Apart from being rated amongst the Top 10 Best Public Schools in Delhi/ NCR, the school also prides in the distinction of being awarded the Best E School in Delhi/NCR. (August 2016)

The school is affiliated to the Central Board of Secondary Education (CBSE). The students have been ranked within the top 0.1% at the All India level. The school holds the All India First Rank in Fashion Studies for two consecutive years.

The school may be entered at Nursery or Pre-Nursery level.

Facilities

Educational technologies 
Smart 'Technology Empowered Classrooms'
The school has computer aided teaching through Smart Class using plasma screens with a Smart Assessment System (SAS) in all the classes.  SAS is a tool which allows teachers to assess and immediately evaluate their students' learning. The system is designed so that the students answer multiple choice questions, using a hand held device by pressing the appropriate button. The data are stored and the teacher can generate a wide range of reports with respect to the whole class and each individual student.

Smart Class is an interactive computer based aid. Through the Smart Class program teachers use digital resources such as animation, videos, diagrams, maps, graphs, and models, while teaching the chosen topic in the classroom.

yellowRide - School Bus Tracker with Bus Attendance Records Management
The school has equipped the school buses with yellowRide Console which help parents as well as school management to track real-time location of school buses live on map interface along with estimated time arrival (ETA) of bus at home location. Parents can also view pickup and dropoff location of their child. Cancel Pickup option in the app helps student inform prior when taking a day off. yellowRide platform also offers a solution to store all attendance records over cloud with  no hassle of maintaining registers for bus attendants/incharges. This platform was developed by one of the student of Doon Public School.

Math Lab
The multiple teaching and learning aids comprise technology applications, videos, manipulative and measuring instruments, tables, and charts.

Seminar Hall
The hall is equipped with presentation tools and so is a venue for seminars and conferences. The school has hosted two national seminars, in 2004 and 2006, on the topics ‘Biotechnology: The Science of the Future’ and ‘Information Technology: Its application in School Education’ respectively.

Fashion Studies Workshop
For Class XI the Faculty of Fashion Studies trains the students in the theory and practice of garment manufacturing through hands on experience in textile selection, designing, cutting, and sewing.

Biotechnology Lab
Students have an option to select this subject in Class XI. The Bio-Tech Lab is a set up with the facility for tissue culture. Students conduct experiments and take up projects of post graduation level.

Other facilities 
 Music and Dance Rooms for vocal music and dance - Indian classical, western and folk. Also for instrumental music - keyboard, guitar, violin, tabla, flute, mandolin, harmonium, school brass band.
 Abacus is a program which enables students to achieve high standards of mental arithmetic.
 Boarding facility is available for non-Delhiite students of classes V to XII. There are wings for boys and girls.

See also
Education in India
Education in Delhi
List of schools in Delhi
 CBSE

References

External links

Schools in West Delhi
Schools in Delhi
1976 establishments in Delhi